Erronea errones, the wandering cowry or erroneous cowry, is a species of sea snail, a cowry, a marine gastropod mollusk in the family Cypraeidae, the cowries.

Description
The dorsum is usually pale brown or greenish, with very variable patterns of darker greenish trasversal bands or spots. The base and the teeth of the aperture are white. In the living cowries the papillose greenish mantle grants the camouflage.

Distribution
This species is distributed in the East Indian Ocean along South India, Andaman Islands, Madagascar and Tanzania, as well in West Pacific Ocean along Indonesia, Malaysia, Philippines, New Caledonia, Samoa and Australia.

Habitat
These cowries live in shallow tropical waters at low tide, usually under rocks or stones, feeding on algae.

Synonyms
 Cypraea errones, Linnaeus, 1758
 Cypraea oblonga, Gmelin, J.F., 1791
 Cypraea bimaculata, (Gray 1824)
 Cypraea coxi, (Brazier 1872)
 Cypraea pusilla, Gmelin, J.F., 1791
 Cypraea coerulescens, Schroter, J.S., 1804 : E Australia
 Cypraea ovum, Kiener, L.C., 1843
 Cypraea chrysophaea, Melvill, J.C., 1888
 Cypraea compressa, Dautzenberg, Ph., 1903
 Erronea nimiproba, Iredale, T., 1935
 Cypraea nimiserrans, Iredale, T., 1935
 Cypraea magerrones, Iredale, T., 1939 : E Australia
 Cypraea probaIredale, T., 1939 : W Australia
 Erronea kalavo, Steadman, W.R. & B.C. Cotton, 1943
 Erronea vivili, Steadman, W.R. & B.C. Cotton, 1943
 Palmadusta asellus fusca (f), Coen, G.S., 1949
 Erronea fusca, Coen, G.S., 1949

References

 Verdcourt, B. (1959). The cowries of the East African Coast: Supplement II. JEANHS XXIII (100): 130-134
 Natarajan, A V (1954) - On the breeding habits of the Cowry Erronea errones (Linne) - Current Science, 23 (7). pp. 225–226

External links
 Biolib
 
 Flmnh
 Poppe-images
 Erronea errones

errones
Gastropods described in 1758
Taxa named by Carl Linnaeus